Acree may refer to:

Acree, Georgia, a community in the United States
, an American navy Cannon-class destroyer escort
, an American navy John C. Butler-class destroyer escort

People with this surname 

 Cindy Acree (born 1961), US politician
 Lloyd Edgar Acree (1920-1942), US Navy sailor
John White Acree (died 1942), after whom  was named
 Neal Acree (born 1974),US composer
T. J. Acree (born 1982), Canadian footballer